Pela may refer to:

 Pela (band), an American indie rock band
 Péla, a town and sub-prefecture in Guinea
 Péla (dish), a French dish
 Pela language, a language of southern China
 Mike Pela, British music producer
 Niccolò di Piero Lamberti (ca. 1370 – 1451), also known as il Pela, Italian sculptor and architect

See also 
 Pelah (disambiguation)
 Pella (disambiguation)
 Pele (disambiguation)